is a female Japanese comedy duo (kombi) consisting of Haruna Kondo (近藤春菜) and Haruka Minowa (箕輪はるか) who have featured in a number of television shows. They are employed by Yoshimoto Kogyo, and are mainly active in Tokyo. They graduated from Yoshimoto NSC's 9th generation class and are referred to as Harisen for short.

Members 

 Haruna Kondo (近藤 春菜), Born February 23, 1983 in Komae, Tokyo. Plays the tsukkomi (sometimes boke). She is a graduate of Toho Gakuen College of Drama and Music with a specialization in Japanese culture studies.
 Haruka Minowa (箕輪 はるか), Born January 1, 1980 in Fuchū, Tokyo. Plays the boke (sometimes tsukkomi). She is a graduate of Waseda University, Faculty of Letters, Arts and Sciences with a specialization in humanities.

Life and career 
The duo met each other in the Yoshimoto NSC academy and formed the unit in 2003, debuting the next year in 2004. In 2005, the group joined a theatre unit for Yoshimoto called Gekidan Guts with other newcomer comedians. Later that same year, the unit saw major success through appearances on various variety and comedian audition television programs.

In 2007 and 2009, Harisenbon made it as a finalist at M-1 Grand Prix.

In the following years, Harisenbon became one of the most popular female comedy duos, with numerous appearances per year on television.

Media
This list consists of only media appearances made by the duo when they appear together as Harisenbon.

Television

Current regular programs
  (TBS TV) (2013–Present)
  (Nippon TV)
  (Nippon TV)
  (TV Shizuoka)
  (TV Tokyo) (2017–Present)

Dramas
  (TV Tokyo) (2006) as Haruna and Haruka
  (Fuji TV) (2007)
  (Nippon TV) (2008)
  (TV Asahi) (2011)

Commercials
Cream Genmai Bran (Asahi Foods, 2009)
Meiko Gijuku - Narration
Hotto Motto - alongside Katsura Bunshi VI
Kyushu Shinkansen (Kyushu Railway Company, 2012) - alongside Morisanchu
Leopalace21 (2012) - alongside Maki Horikita
Yomeishu Seizo Company (2013)
Round One Entertainment (2014)
Manulife Life Insurance (Manulife, 2014)
Big Hero 6 (Disney, 2015)
Gyu-Kaku (2017)
Daito Trust Construction (2017) - alongside Hinako Sakurai

References

External links 
 Official Profile on Yoshimoto Kogyo

Japanese comedy duos
Comedians from Tokyo